Bare is a village in the municipality of Mitrovica in the District of Mitrovica, Kosovo. According to the 2011 census, it had 841 inhabitants, all of whom were Albanian.

Notes

References 

Villages in Mitrovica, Kosovo